The S2 9.1 is an American sailboat that was designed by Graham & Schlageter as a Midget Ocean Racing Club (MORC) racer and first built in 1983. The boat was built in a variety of models. The designation indicates the approximate length overall in meters.

Production
The design was built by S2 Yachts in Holland, Michigan, United States from 1983 until 1987 with 127 boats completed, but it is now out of production.

Design
The S2 9.1 is a racing keelboat, built predominantly of fiberglass, with wood trim. It has a masthead sloop rig, a raked stem, a plumb transom, a transom-hung rudder controlled by a tiller and a fixed fin keel.

The first seven boats built were delivered to customers with a shorter mast, now known as the "9.1 SM". Owners of those boats thought the design was under-powered and a mast about  taller, along with sails with more area were used on later boats and became the standard for the class.

Variants
S2 9.1 SM
This original short mast-equipped model has a mast that is approximately  shorter than the later standard mast.
S2 9.1
S2 9.1 SD
S2 9.1 SE

Operational history
The boat is supported by an active class club that organizes racing events, the S2 9.1 Meter North American One Design Class Association.

In a 2002 review Bill Brockway reported in Sailing World, "one successful racer from Seattle says that his S2 9.1 tall-rig boat is a good all-rounder in medium air, best upwind at the upper end of a No. 1, and can sail well going deep on a downwind leg."

See also
List of sailing boat types

References

Keelboats
1980s sailboat type designs
Sailing yachts
Sailboat type designs by Graham & Schlageter
Sailboat types built by S2 Yachts